In the United States military, the Assistant Secretary of Defense for Manpower and Reserve Affairs (ASD (M&RA)), formerly Assistant Secretary of Defense for Reserve Affairs (ASD (RA)) serves as Principal Staff Assistant and advisor to the Secretary of Defense, Deputy Secretary of Defense and Under Secretary of Defense for Personnel and Readiness, with responsibility for "overall policies and procedures of [U.S.] Total Force manpower, personnel and reserve affairs," including the Army National Guard, Army Reserve, Navy Reserve, Marine Corps Reserve, Air National Guard, Air Force Reserve and Coast Guard Reserve. The ASD (M&RA) reports directly to the Under Secretary of Defense (P&R) and exercises authority,  direction, and control over the National Committee for Employer Support of the Guard and Reserve. On April 23, 2021, President Biden announced his intent to nominate Brenda Sue Fulton, an openly lesbian veteran and West Point alumna, to the position.

Responsibilities

According to a Statement of Intent signed by the ASD(M&RA), the purpose of the office is "to set the conditions for a sustainable, seamlessly integrated and complementary total force." To do so, the ASD(M&RA) seeks to "proactively deliver credible advice and information about the capabilities of the reserve components," and "develop the policies and resources necessary to fully exploit those capabilities." The language of these statements is precise and deliberate. As the Statement of Intent explains:

 The ASD(M&RA) "sets the conditions" because the individual armed services must integrate the forces themselves.
 “Seamlessly integrated” and “complementary” are characteristics of a reserve force that can augment and reinforce the active components in every facet of the National Security Strategy.  These characteristics imply an absence of friction and a mutually supporting force structure.
  A  “total force” is the combination of active and reserve components that service chiefs provide willingly, and that unified combatant commanders can utilize effectively.
 “Delivering credible advice and information” requires fidelity to fact and a humility that avoids boastfulness and over-promising.
 “Resources” include modern and well-positioned equipment and facilities, and the assets necessary for a force that is trained for both irregular and conventional warfare prior to mobilization and deployment.
  To "exploit" reserve capabilities means “to take full advantage” of them.  In business, it would mean a high return on investment.

The Statement of Intent also sets out a metric for this office's performance: "Our success will be measured by the degree to which we have advanced a culture of mutual appreciation and confidence in both the active and reserve components."

History

This position was mandated by the Department of Defense Authorization Act of 1984 (P.L. 98-94, passed 24 September 1983), and established by Defense Directive 5125.1, signed 12 January 1984. The reserve affairs functions were transferred in from the Assistant Secretary of Defense (Manpower, Reserve Affairs, and Logistics).

Section 902 of the Carl Levin and Howard P. "Buck" McKeon National Defense Authorization Act for Fiscal Year 2015 (P.L. 113-291, 19 December 2014) redesignated the position as the Assistant Secretary of Defense for Manpower and Reserve Affairs.

Office holders

References